Tabbora was a town in the late Roman province of Africa Proconsularis. The Catholic diocese that had its seat there was a suffragan of Carthage, the capital of the province.

Location 
Tabbora is believed to have been situated in the vicinity of the stone ruins at Tembra, located west of Bijga (ancient Bisica) in the valley of Wadi Siliana, Tunisia.

Bishops

Two bishops are known:
Marinus, present at the Conference of Carthage (411), where his rival was Victor, also rival of the Bishop of Bisica; 
Constantine, who signed the letter from the bishops of the province to Patriarch Paul II of Constantinople, against the Monothelites (646).

No longer a residential see, Tabbora is included in the Catholic Church's list of titular sees.

References

Attribution

External links
Catholic Hierarchy page

Catholic titular sees in Africa